Sophie Sonia Perin (born 1957) is a French model and beauty queen who was the first Miss International winner from her country.

Before her victory in Tokyo, Japan, in 1976, she competed as France's representative in the Miss Universe 1975 in San Salvador, El Salvador, and in the Miss World 1975 in London, United Kingdom. In both pageants, she was unplaced.

References

1957 births
French beauty pageant winners
Living people
Miss International winners
Miss International 1976 delegates
Miss Universe 1975 contestants
Miss World 1975 delegates